Białężyn  is a village in the administrative district of Gmina Murowana Goślina, within Poznań County, Greater Poland Voivodeship, in west-central Poland.

The village has a population of 240. It has a church whose history goes back to 1725, when the demolished church of Słomowo was re-erected in Białężyn.

References

Villages in Poznań County